Macrorhyncolus littoralis, the driftwood weevil, is a species of true weevil in the family of beetles known as Curculionidae.

References

Further reading

External links

 

Cossoninae
Beetles described in 1880